When It All Comes Down is an EP by the  rock band Home Grown, released in 2004 by Drive-Thru Records. It was the band's final release, as they went on "indefinite hiatus" the following year. The EP found the band moving away from the humor-filled pop punk of their previous releases and towards more heartfelt and emotional subject matter. Bassist Adam Lohrbach would carry these stylistic elements over to his subsequent band New Years Day and continue to expand on them.

Track listing

Personnel
John Tran - vocals, guitar
Dan Hammond - guitar, vocals
Adam Lohrbach - vocals, bass
Darren Reynolds - drums

Album information 
Record label: Drive-Thru Records
Produced, mixed, and engineered by Parker Case
Co-produced by Home Grown
Recorded and mixed at Tetty Nash Studios in Coto de Caza, California
Mastered by Louie Teran at Marcussen Mastering in Hollywood, California
Tracks 1, 3 & 5 written by John Tran
Tracks 2, 4 & 6 written by Adam Lohrbach
Design by Joshua M. Ortega

References 

Home Grown albums
2004 EPs
Drive-Thru Records EPs